E. R. Fightmaster (born 1991/1992) is an American non-binary actor, producer and writer.

Early life and education 
Fightmaster grew up in Cincinnati, Ohio, attending the Seven Hills School. They then started college at the University of Cincinnati before moving to Chicago and earning a degree from DePaul University in women and gender studies.

Acting career 
Fightmaster is a former member of The Second City's Chicago and touring companies. Their previous work includes performing with Boom Chicago, an English-language comedy troupe in Amsterdam, the Netherlands. In 2020, Fightmaster was named a member of the CBS creative and writing team to lead the studio's actors showcase, formerly known as the CBS Diversity Sketch Comedy Showcase.

Following a two-season stint on Hulu's Shrill, in 2021, Fightmaster was cast in a recurring role on Grey's Anatomy as the show's first non-binary doctor.

Musical career 
Aside from acting work, they are one half of the music duo "Twin".

Personal life 
Fightmaster is their real surname. "People will never stop asking me how it's spelled," they told the Chicago Tribune in 2018.

Filmography

References

External links 
 
 

Living people
American non-binary actors
Actors from Cincinnati
American television writers
DePaul University alumni
Year of birth missing (living people)
21st-century LGBT people
Non-binary writers
University of Cincinnati alumni
Seven Hills School (Cincinnati, Ohio) alumni